A statue of Ludwig van Beethoven is installed in Los Angeles' Pershing Square, in the U.S. state of California.

See also 

 List of sculptures of Ludwig van Beethoven

References

External links
 

Downtown Los Angeles
Monuments and memorials in Los Angeles
Outdoor sculptures in Greater Los Angeles
Sculptures of Ludwig van Beethoven
Sculptures of men in California
Statues in Los Angeles